Mentodus is a genus of tubeshoulders.

Species
There are currently eight recognized species in this genus:
 Mentodus bythios (Matsui & Rosenblatt, 1987)
 Mentodus crassus A. E. Parr, 1960
 Mentodus eubranchus (Matsui & Rosenblatt, 1987)
 Mentodus facilis (A. E. Parr, 1951)
 Mentodus longirostris (Sazonov & Golovan, 1976)
 Mentodus mesalirus (Matsui & Rosenblatt, 1987)
 Mentodus perforatus Sazonov & Trunov, 1978
 Mentodus rostratus (Günther, 1878)

References

Platytroctidae
Taxa named by Albert Eide Parr
Ray-finned fish genera